Novokuznetsovka is a rural locality (a settlement) in Karamyshevsky Selsoviet, Zmeinogorsky District, Altai Krai, Russia. The population was 125 as of 2013. There is 1 street.

Geography 
Novokuznetsovka is located 16 km northwest of Zmeinogorsk (the district's administrative centre) by road. Karamyshevo is the nearest rural locality.

References 

Rural localities in Zmeinogorsky District